Steer Creek may refer to:

Steer Creek (California), a tributary of Carpinteria Creek
Steer Creek (West Virginia), a tributary of the Little Kanawha River